Clarkmobile was an automobile first built in 1902 by Frank Clark of Clark & Company in Lansing, Michigan.  The first model became available in 1903.  A newspaper article referred to the automobile as the 'Unbreakable Clarkmobile' and showed it surviving an accident.

Before the Clarkmobile, Clark & Company Carriage Works built the body for the first test car produced by Ransom E. Olds.

Production ceased in 1904. The Deere-Clark company purchased the company's tools and machinery.  Frank Clark went on to make the Clark car in Shelbyville, Indiana.

Features

The Clarkmobile included a number of innovative features such as wheel steering, shaft drive, a front end with hood, and a new engine design.

References 

Defunct motor vehicle manufacturers of the United States
Defunct manufacturing companies based in Lansing, Michigan
Motor vehicle manufacturers based in Michigan